The Tales of Ensign Stål (Swedish: Fänrik Ståls sägner) is a 1926 Swedish historical war film directed by John W. Brunius and starring John Ericsson, Edvin Adolphson and Olga Andersson. It is based on the epic poem The Tales of Ensign Stål by nineteenth century writer Johan Ludvig Runeberg set during the Finnish War during the Napoleonic Era in which Sweden lost the Finland to the Russian Empire. It was shot at the Råsunda Studios in Stockholm. The film's sets were designed by the art director Vilhelm Bryde. It was released in two parts.

Cast
 Edvin Adolphson as 	Col. Georg Karl von Döbeln
 Olga Andersson as 	Lady von Schwerin
 Hugo Björne as von Schwerin
 Artur Cederborgh as 	Peasant
 Thor Christiernsson as Lode
 Carl Deurell as Maj. Otto von Fieandt
 Anita Dorr as 	Karin
 Leopold Edin as 	Van Suchtelen
 Arvid Enström as 	Spelt
 John Ericsson as 	Lt. Stål
 Josef Fischer as Jägerhorn
 Einar Fröberg as Klingspor
 Ida Gawell-Blumenthal as 	Lotta Svärd
 Fredrik Gjerdrum as 	Cronstedt
 Vilhelm Hansson as 	Drufva
 Thure Holm as 	Von Törne
 Helge Karlsson as Munter	
 Axel Lagerberg as 	Wibelius
 Sven Lindström as 	Löwenhielm
 Alfred Lundberg as 	Af Klercker
 Thor Modéen as 	Johan August Sandels
 Adolf Niska as 	Jakob Petrovitsh Kulnev
 Nils Ohlin as Wilhelm von Schwerin
 Gustav Ranft as 	Col. von Essen
 Edit Rolf as 	Inga
 Carl-Michael Runeberg as 	Johan Ludvig Runeberg
 Axel Slangus as 	Sven Dufva
 Oscar Textorius as 	Von Buxhovden
 Nils Wahlbom as 	Maj. Gen. Adlercreutz
 Anna-Lisa Wallin as 	Mrs. af Enehielm	
 Anders Wikman as Captain af Enehielm

References

Bibliography
 Gustafsson, Tommy. Masculinity in the Golden Age of Swedish Cinema: A Cultural Analysis of 1920s Films. McFarland, 2014.
 Sadoul, Georges. Dictionary of Film Makers. University of California Press, 1972.

External links

1926 films
1920s war films
Swedish war films
Swedish silent feature films
Swedish black-and-white films
Films directed by John W. Brunius
1920s Swedish-language films
Swedish historical films
1920s historical films
Films set in the 19th century
1920s Swedish films